We Serve is a British short film about the lives of officers in the Auxiliary Territorial Service (ATS). Designed as a recruitment and training film, it was directed by Carol Reed, produced by Sydney Box, and was made by Box's company Verity Films.

The involvement of Reed as director enabled Box to secure the services of several leading British actresses for the film, all agreeing to be paid the small sum of £5 per day. The film also featured the then Director of the ATS, Jean Knox.

The 30-minute film was commissioned shortly after the British government changed the nature of the ATS from being a voluntary body to becoming a professional service with full military status in April 1941. It was concurrent with a wider recruitment drive to expand the size of the ATS. In its efforts to attract recruits, the film emphasised that femininity could be retained in wartime.

See also
 The Gentle Sex - a 1943 film about recruits in the ATS

References

1942 films
British short films
Films directed by Carol Reed
Films produced by Sydney Box
World War II films made in wartime